Pterostylis cernua, commonly known as the Westland greenhood, is a species of orchid endemic to New Zealand. Non-flowering plants have a rosette of leaves but flowering plants have a single white, dark green and reddish-brown flower with leaves on the flowering stem.

Description
Pterostylis cernua is a terrestrial, perennial, deciduous, herb with an underground tuber. Flowering plants have a single green flower with translucent white lines and a reddish-brown tinge on the tips. The dorsal sepal and petals are fused, forming a hood or "galea" over the column. The labellum is curved, dark green with a blackish callus along its centre line. Flowering occurs from November to January.

Taxonomy and naming
Pterostylis cernua was first formally described in 1997 by  David Jones, Brian Molloy and Mark Clements and the description was published in The Orchadian. The specific epithet (cernua) is a Latin word meaning "drooping", "stooping", "facing earthward" or "nodding".

Distribution and habitat
The Westland greenhood grows in grass and sphagnum moss in swampy ground and in seasonally flooded areas. It is only known from the west coast of the South Island near Hokitika, Kumara and Lake Mahinapua.

References

cernua
Orchids of New Zealand
Plants described in 1997